Dales Radio is a community radio station broadcasting in the Yorkshire Dales in Northern England, to communities including Hawes, Sedbergh, Grassington, Settle, Ingleton and Leyburn. It is the largest community radio station in the United Kingdom in terms of the extent of its broadcast area, but one of the smallest in terms of population.

History
Dales Radio launched on 11 January 2016, following the closure in 2012 of Fresh Radio, a commercial radio station covering the Yorkshire Dales area. A number of presenters and staff at Dales Radio were previously involved with Fresh Radio. 

In 2021, the station began to expand its coverage across the Yorkshire Dales National Park. This involves installing new transmitter sites in unserved parts of the region. A new transmitter at Leyburn, on 104.9 FM, went live on 2 April 2021.

Programming 
Dales Radio is a not-for-profit community radio station and aims to enhance the lives of those living in and visiting the Yorkshire Dales National Park. Much of the station's output consists of pop music and local information, with specialist music shows delivered during off-peak hours. The station's Key Commitments require it to deliver "reports on items of local interest, traffic and travel, weather, public service announcements, interviews and discussions".

Transmission 
Dales Radio broadcasts from an AM transmitter previously used by commercial radio station Fresh Radio. This transmits from a site in Hawes on a frequency of 936kHz with a power of 150 watts and coverage extends across the sparsely populated Yorkshire Dales National Park. The following FM transmitters are also used in populated parts of the region:

The station is licensed to broadcast on FM to the Hawes, Kirkby Stephen and Sedbergh areas and aims to expand into these areas as funds allow.

References

External links
Official Website

Radio stations in Yorkshire
Radio stations established in 2016
Community radio stations in the United Kingdom
Radio stations in the United Kingdom